Contras'city is a Senegalese 1969 short documentary film.

Synopsis 
A fictional documentary that portrays the city of Dakar, Senegal, as we hear the conversation between a Senegalese man (the director, Djibril Diop Mambéty) and a French woman, Inge Hirschnitz. As we travel through the city in a picturesque horse-drawn wagon, we chaotically rush into this and that popular neighborhood of the capital, discovering contrast after contrast: A small African community waiting at the Church's door, Muslims praying on the sidewalk, the Rococo architecture of the Government buildings, the modest stores of the craftsmen near the main market.

See also
 Cinema of Senegal

References 

1968 films
1969 documentary films
1968 short films
1960s short documentary films
Dakar
Documentary films about cities
Docufiction films
Senegalese short documentary films
Films directed by Djibril Diop Mambéty